Godavari Biorefineries Ltd., formerly The Godavari Sugar Mills Ltd., is a company in India which operates two sugar refineries and manufactures more than 20 products from renewable resources.

Samir Somaiya is the company's joint managing director, as well as president of the Indian Sugar Mills Association.

References

External links
Somaiya Group - About Godavari Biorefineries Ltd.

Sugar companies of India
Manufacturing companies based in Mumbai
Renewable resource companies established in 1939
Manufacturing companies established in 1939
Sugar refineries
Indian companies established in 1939